The Ray Stanley Memorial Trophy (sometimes known as the Ray Stanley Memorial Shield) is an English association football trophy contested, until 2007, in an annual match usually contested between local rivals Hyde United and Stalybridge Celtic to commemorate Ray Stanley, the former secretary of Hyde United, who died in 2000.

Winners

External links
2001 Match Report
2002 Match Report
2003 Match Report
2004 Match Report
2005 Match Report
2006 Match Report

Football competitions in England
Sport in Tameside